Brightspeed of Missouri, LLC is a telephone operating company owned by Brightspeed that provides local telephone service in Missouri. The cities served by the company include Branson and Columbia.

History
Brightspeed of Missouri was established as CenturyTel of Missouri, LLC on 10/17/20012 upon CenturyTel's purchase of lines from Verizon Communications. The lines in Missouri were transferred from GTE Midwest, which was originally an operating company of GTE. Included in the transfer were lines that GTE acquired in its purchase of Contel.

Following the sale, GTE Midwest was dissolved.

Sale
On August 3, 2021, Lumen announced its sale of its local telephone assets in 20 states to Apollo Global Management, including Missouri. 

The company was renamed Brightspeed of Missouri, LLC following the sale.

See also
GTE Midwest
GTE
Brightspeed

References

Lumen Technologies
Verizon Communications
Communications in Missouri
2002 establishments in Missouri
American companies established in 2002
Telecommunications companies established in 2002